The three teams in this group played against each other on a home-and-away basis. The group winner Scotland qualified for the sixth FIFA World Cup held in Sweden.

Table

Matches

References

External links
FIFA official page
RSSSF - 1958 World Cup Qualification
Allworldcup

9
1956–57 in Swiss football
1957–58 in Swiss football
1956–57 in Scottish football
1957–58 in Scottish football
1956–57 in Spanish football
1957–58 in Spanish football
Qualification group